St Peter Claver College is a Roman Catholic co-educational secondary school located in the suburb of Riverview in Ipswich, Queensland, Australia. It was founded in 1976, on the traditional lands of the Ugarapul clan of the Yuggera Nation, and was named in honour of St Peter Claver, the Spanish Jesuit priest and patron saint of the slaves.

Cultures

St Peter Claver College is a culturally diverse school which draws its students from a wide range of backgrounds. Many of the students and staff are Aboriginal, Torres Strait Islander, Samoan, Tongan, Maori and Cook Islander, as well as Vietnamese, Ugandan, Indian, Chinese, Filipino, and many others. The college offers Cultural Dance, the study of different cultures (in subjects such as Religion, Social Studies and History), and the study of different languages (Japanese).

Subjects and curriculum
The Claver curriculum is organised around the two phases of learning in secondary schools, each designed to meet the developmental needs of students: a middle phase aged 13–14 and a senior phase for students aged 15–17. Students take courses in a wide variety of areas, including sciences, mathematics, English, information technology, and the arts.

Rugby league program
St Peter Claver College offers a range of different sports to students in year levels 8-12. One of these is the rugby league program aimed at developing and perfecting students' skills and techniques. St Peter Claver enters a team(s) from each grade to participate in the CISSSA (Combined Ipswich Secondary School Sport Association) competition.  Each year level holds two teams. The a team has the opportunity to enter the Broncos Challenge Cup and compete if they win their games in a round robin tournament. Each year Claver has a team from each year level make this tournament. The b team then competes in the CISSSA Competition.  In grade 9, 10, 11 and 12, students may select rugby league as a HPE subject. St Peter Claver has developed promising NRL stars Anthony Milford (Canberra Raiders) and Tautau Moga (Sydney Roosters) and Brett Greinke, who plays in Broncos under 20s and Queensland side.  St Peter Claver has had many Queensland and Met West students attend the school.  Claver Rugby League students attend the Confraternity Cup every year.

Principals 
The school principals have been a mix of Marist Brothers and lay teachers:

 Bob Cullen (1976-1986)
 Kenneth Welsh (Marist brother)
 Dominic O’Sullivan (Marist brother)
 Peter Carroll (Marist brother)
 Michael Carroll
 Kerry Mulkerin
 Diarmuid O'Riordan
 Niall Coburn
 Terry Finan
Bruce Mcphee

Notable alumni

 Anthony Milford
 Tautau Moga
 Joe Ofahengaue
Dylan Wenzel-Halls, professional soccer player for Brisbane Roar
 Paulo Aokuso, amateur boxer, competing in the 2021 Tokyo Olympics

References

High schools in Queensland
Educational institutions established in 1976
Catholic schools in Queensland
Schools in Ipswich, Queensland
1976 establishments in Australia
Association of Marist Schools of Australia
Riverview, Queensland